Kompany is a surname. It may refer to:

François Kompany (born 1989), Belgian footballer of Congolese descent
Pierre Kompany (born 1947), Belgian politician
Vincent Kompany (born 1986), Belgian footballer of Congolese descent

It may also refer to:

 Kompany (musician), an American electronic dance music producer

See also
"Kompanie" (2018 song) rap song by Bonez MC and RAF Camora, from the album Palmen aus Plastik 2
Electric Kompany, American band
L-KO Kompany, an American motion picture company founded by Henry Lehrman that produced silent comedy shorts between 1914 and 1919
Company (disambiguation)